The 1975 Lombard regional election took place on 15 June 1975. The 2nd term of the Regional Council was chosen.

Electoral law 
Election was held under proportional representation with provincial constituencies where the largest remainder method with a Droop quota was used. To ensure more proportionality, remained votes and seats were transferred at regional level and calculated at-large.

Results
Despite the huge jump made by the Communist Party, which gained nearly 7 point more than five years before and won the majority of votes in Milan, the Christian Democracy party remained the largest party and incumbent president Cesare Golfari was able to form a second center-left government with the support of the PSI, the PSDI and the PRI. 

<noinclude>

Seats by province

1975 elections in Italy
Regional elections in Lombardy